Tumachlar (also Romanized as Tūmāchlar; also known as Tūmāchār) is a village in Jafarbay-ye Sharqi Rural District, Gomishan District, Torkaman County, Golestan Province, Iran. At the 2006 census, its population was 601, in 123 families.

References 

Populated places in Torkaman County